John Leon may refer to:

Sir John Leon, 4th Baronet (born 1934)
John Paul Leon (1972–2021), comic artist